Arp 272 is a pair of interacting galaxies consisting of the two spiral galaxies NGC 6050 (left) and IC 1179 (right). Arp 272 lies around 450 million light years from Earth in the constellation of Hercules. The galaxies are part of the Hercules Cluster, which is itself part of the CfA2 Great Wall.

The two galaxies in Arp 272 are in physical contact through their spiral arms. A third galaxy can be seen at the top of them; that galaxy is also interacting with them.

References

External links
 

272
Interacting galaxies
NGC objects
IC objects
Hercules (constellation)
Hercules Cluster